Fours may refer to several things:

Places
Fours may refer to the following places in France:
Fours, Gironde, in the Gironde département
Fours, Nièvre, in the Nièvre département
Fours-en-Vexin, in the Eure département 
Fours-St. Laurent, in the Provence-Alpes-Cote D'Azur département

Other uses
 Coxless four: a competitive event in the sport of rowing where a boat is propelled by four rowers, each with one oar
 Four-bar phrases in music in quadruple meter

See also

Quad (disambiguation)
Four (disambiguation)
4S (disambiguation)